Faulconer County is a fictional county in the state of Virginia, a setting in the Starbuck Chronicles by Bernard Cornwell set during the American Civil War.

Faulconer County is the historical home of the Faulconer family, who in 1861 are headed by Washington Faulconer, his wife Miriam and their children Adam Faulconer and Anna, who is engaged to Ethan Ridley. The Faulconers are of English extraction and have their own coat of arms.

The main settlements in the county are Faulconer Court House and Roskill. Faulconer Court House is the centre of the Faulconer's lives, it is here that their estate of Seven Springs, also there is the court house which gives the town its name, the Faulconer County Bank, the local school at which Major Thaddeus "Pecker" Bird teaches along with his wife Priscilla.

See also
Faulkner County, Arkansas
Virginia

Fictional counties
Virginia counties
Virginia in fiction